Nichts passiert (Nothing Happens) is the third studio album by German band Silbermond. It was released on March 20, 2009. The album's lead single, Irgendwas bleibt, was released on February 20, 2009. The album debuted at #1 of the German, Austrian and Swiss album charts. In Germany, it remained there for three weeks.

Track listing

Charts

Weekly charts

Year-end charts

Certifications and sales

References

2009 albums
German-language albums
Silbermond albums